The San Antonio Open was a tournament for professional female tennis players played on outdoor hard courts. The event was a part of the 2016 WTA 125K series and was held in San Antonio, United States.

Past finals

Singles

Doubles

External links